Bill Dennis (born December 9, 1935) is a former NASCAR driver and rookie of the year in the Winston Cup Series.

Racing career
Dennis made his debut at age 26 at the 1962 Capital City 300 in the No. 98 and finished 15th. After three part-time seasons, he attempted a full-time schedule in 1970 and he had five Top 10 finishes for Donlavey Racing.  He was given the NASCAR Rookie of the Year award in 1970. He competed full-time for the last time during the following season for Donlavey and had ten Top 10 finishes and a pole position. In 1972 he competed for three teams and earned two Top 5 finishes. He competed in a few races until his last start came in the 1981 World 600.

Accomplishments 
Dennis won the Permatex 300 at Daytona three consecutive years (1972–1974), a feat matched only by Dale Earnhardt and Dale Earnhardt Jr., and later surpassed by Tony Stewart, who won four consecutive from 2008 to 2011.

Personal life
Bill's son Ricky Dennis is the founder of Arena Racing USA and also a former stock car driver. He was born in Las Vegas, Nevada but was raised and lived in Tappahannock, Virginia.

References

External links
 

1935 births
Living people
NASCAR drivers
People from Henrico County, Virginia
Racing drivers from Virginia